The 2012 V8 Supercar season was the sixteenth year in which V8 Supercars have contested the premier Australian Touring car racing series. It was the 53rd year of touring car racing in Australia since the first running of the Australian Touring Car Championship, now known as the International V8 Supercars Championship, and the Armstrong 500, the fore-runner of the present day Bathurst 1000.

The season began on 1 March at the Adelaide Street Circuit and concluded on 2 December at the Homebush Street Circuit. It featured the sixteenth V8 Supercar Championship, contested over 30 races at 15 events. Thirteen of these events were held in the six states and the Northern Territory of Australia, and single events were staged in New Zealand and the United Arab Emirates. There was also a stand-alone, non-championship event supporting the 2012 Australian Grand Prix. The season also included the thirteenth second-tier Dunlop V8 Supercar Series, contested over seven rounds. For the fifth time a third-tier series was contested, the Kumho Tyres V8 Touring Car Series, which was expanded to six rounds for 2012.

Race calendar
Dates sourced from:

IVC – International V8 Supercar Championship
DVS – Dunlop V8 Supercar Series
KVTC – Kumho Tyres V8 Touring Car Series
NC – Non-championship

International V8 Supercars Championship

Dunlop V8 Supercar Series

Kumho Tyres V8 Touring Car Series

V8 Supercars Albert Park Challenge

References

External links
 Official V8 Supercar website

Supercar seasons